Rajkumar Sharma (born 14 November 1973) is a politician from the Indian state of Rajasthan. He is a member of Rajasthan Legislative Assembly from Nawalgarh constituency of Jhunjhunu.

Early life
Rajkumar Sharma was born on 14 November 1973 in Parasrampura, Rajasthan. He has a Masters degree in Sanskrit and a Ph.D.

Posts held
 1992–1997, President, Akhil Rajasthan Sanskrit Chatra Sangharsh Samiti
 1993–1995, President, Maharaj Sanskrit Mahavidyalaya (elected three times consecutively)
 1995, Student Senator (elected), Rajasthan University
 1999–2000, President (elected), Rajasthan University Students' Union
 2001, President, Yuva Vikas Manch
 2008–2013, Member 13th Rajasthan Legislative Assembly, represented Nawalgarh Assembly Constituency by winning the election on Bahujan Samaj Party (BSP) seat with the highest margin of 14088 votes in entire Jhunjhunu district.
 2009–2013, Minister of State for Science & Technology (Independent Charge); Medical & Health, Family Welfare, Ayurveda and Medical Education, Government of Rajasthan..
 2013 onwards, Member 14th Rajasthan Legislative Assembly, representing Nawalgarh Assembly Constituency by winning the election as an Independent candidate with a huge margin of 33566 votes.
2018 onwards, Member 15th Rajasthan Legislative Assembly, representing Nawalgarh

Membership of Legislature
 2008–13, 13th Rajasthan Legislative Assembly from Nawalgarh
 2013 onwards Member 14th Rajasthan Legislative Assembly from Nawalgarh

References

Rajasthani politicians
Rajasthan MLAs 2008–2013
Rajasthan MLAs 2013–2018
Living people
People from Jhunjhunu district
University of Rajasthan alumni
1973 births
Rajasthan MLAs 2018–2023